"Anna" is the second promotional single, and fourth overall, taken from the fifth studio album by British indie rock band the Cribs. Unlike the previous two singles released from In the Belly of the Brazen Bull, "Come on, be a No-One" and "Glitters Like Gold", "Anna" did not receive a physical issue on vinyl. Recorded and mixed at Tarbox Road Studios, Cassadaga, New York with producer David Fridmann, the song received mastering treatment in Sterling Sound, New York City from Greg Calbi.

Video
Although similar to the promotional release of "Chi-Town" in February, instead of a physical issue, "Anna" received a visual interpretation through a collaboration with artist and friend of the band Martin Creed, entitled Work #1431. Creed supported the band on their May tour, and also hails from Wakefield, sharing a mutual point of reference. The video features "personal photographs in a fast paced and jolting yet minimalist sequence to the soundtrack of the song."

Track listing

Footnotes

External links
official band website
official record label website

2012 singles
The Cribs songs
Songs written by Gary Jarman
Songs written by Ross Jarman
Songs written by Ryan Jarman
2012 songs
Warner Records singles
Wichita Recordings singles